Egri Bughaz (also Romanized as Egrī Būghāz and Eqrī Būghāz; also known as Eqrī Bū‘āz) is a village in Aqabad Rural District, in the Central District of Gonbad-e Qabus County, Golestan Province, Iran. At the 2006 census, its population was 796, in 174 families.

References 

Populated places in Gonbad-e Kavus County